Zandra Iona Flemister (November 21, 1951 – February 21, 2023) was an American diplomat and United States Secret Service agent. She joined the Secret Service in 1974, becoming the first African American woman to serve as an agent.

Life and career 
Flemister was born November 21, 1951, in Frankfurt, Germany, to American parents (her father was in the U.S. Army). Raised in central Connecticut, she graduated from Glastonbury High School in 1969. She earned a bachelor's degree in political science from Northeastern University in 1973.

Joining the Secret Service in August 1974, Flemister protected the daughters of two U.S. presidents: Susan Ford and Amy Carter. She experienced intense racial discrimination from fellow agents and supervisors and resigned from the agency in June 1978 to join the United States Foreign Service. During her thirty-plus years of employment with the Foreign Service, Flemister rose to the post of Consul General in Pakistan and represented the State Department in liaison with the Federal Bureau of Investigation's Terrorist Screening Center in Washington, D.C. In 2003, she earned a master's degree in national security logistics from the National Defense University. In 2006, she achieved promotion to the Senior Foreign Service.

In 2000, Flemister gave sworn testimony in support of a class action lawsuit alleging that the Secret Service was rife with racial discrimination. She reported that white agents routinely engaged in overt racism, even using the n-word to refer to the presidents of Grenada and Senegal. More than one hundred former agents joined the suit. In 2017, the Secret Service paid $24 million to settle the lawsuit.

Flemister retired in 2011 with early onset Alzheimer's disease. She died on February 21, 2023, at the age of 71.

References 

1951 births
2023 deaths
20th-century African-American women
21st-century African-American women
20th-century American diplomats
21st-century American diplomats
African-American diplomats
African-American women
American consuls
National Defense University alumni
Northeastern University alumni
People from Frankfurt
People from Glastonbury, Connecticut
United States Secret Service agents
United States Department of State officials